Rahibai Soma Popere, born in 1964, is an Indian farmer and conservationist. She helps other farmers return to native varieties of crops, preparing hyacinth beans for self-help groups. She is among three Indians on the BBC list of "100 Women 2018". Scientist Raghunath Mashelkar gave her the epithet "Seed Mother".

Early life 
Popere is from Kombhalne village located in Akole block of Ahmednagar district in the state of Maharashtra. She has no formal education. She has worked on farms all her life and has an extraordinary understanding of crop diversity. she belong to Mahadev Koli community of Maharashtra.

Career 
Rahibai Soma Popere farm land, where she grows 17 different crops. She was visited by the BAIF Development Research Foundation in 2017, who found the gardens she supported had enough produce to meet the dietary requirements of a family for a whole year.

She developed a series of hyacinth beans for self-help groups and families in nearby villages. She was described by Raghunath Mashelkar, the erstwhile Director General of the Council of Scientific and Industrial Research as 'Seed Mother'. She is an active member of the self-help group Kalsubai parisar Biyanse Sarvdhan centre (translation: Committee for seed conservation in the Kalsubai region). She has created her own methods to harvest water on farms; turning wasteland into space she can use productively. She trains farmers and students on ways to select seeds, keep fertile soils and manage pests. She is skilled in four-step paddy cultivation. She has learned to rear poultry in her yard with the support of the Maharashtra Institute of Technology Transfer for Rural Areas (MITTRA).

Awards 
 
 BBC 100 Women 2018
 The Best Seed Saver award
 BAIF Development Research Foundation Best Farmer Award
 Nari Shakti Puraskar, 2018, instituted by the Ministry of Women and Child Development, Government of India.
 Padma Shri, 2020
Ram Nath Kovind presenting Padma Shri to Rahibai Popere
Additionally, in January 2015, she received appreciation from Prem Mathur, Honorary Research Fellow at Bioversity International and from R. R. Hanchinal, Chairperson of a government body for the protection of plant varieties and farmers' rights in India.

References 

Koli people
Indian farmers
1964 births
BBC 100 Women
Living people
Indian women farmers
People from Ahmednagar district
Nari Shakti Puraskar 2018 winners
Farmers' rights activists
Recipients of the Padma Shri in other fields